Neissa albertisi is a species of beetle in the family Cerambycidae. It was described by Breuning in 1956. It is known from Australia.

References

Lamiinae
Beetles described in 1956